The 2018–19 Croatian Women's Football Cup was the twenty-eighth season of the annual Croatian football cup competition. Fourteen teams participated in the competition, all ten teams from the 2018–19 Croatian Women's First Football League and four teams from second level that applied for competition. The competition began on 6 October 2018 and will end on 9 June 2019 with the final in Krapina, a nominally neutral venue. Split were defending champions and successfully defended their title after beating Osijek in the final. Katarina Zrinski and Graničar Đurđevac received bye to the quarter-finals.

Matches

Round of 16

Quarter-finals

Semi-finals

Final

References

External links
Competition rules 

2018 in Croatian women's sport
2019 in Croatian women's sport
Women's football in Croatia
Football competitions in Croatia